Tatyana Nikolayevna Shishkina (born April 27, 1969 in Samara, Russian SFSR) is a Russian-born Kazakhstani judoka, who competed in the women's extra-lightweight category. Holding a dual citizenship to compete internationally, she earned a bronze medal in the 48-kg division at the 2004 Asian Judo Championships in Almaty, and represented her naturalized nation Kazakhstan at the 2004 Summer Olympics.

Shishkina emerged herself in the international scene at the 2001 World Judo Championships in Munich, Germany, where she scored a seventh-place finish for the Russian squad in the 48-kg division. In 2002, Shishkina had decided to transfer her allegiance to Kazakhstan, and then competed for her naturalized squad at the Asian Games in Busan, South Korea, where she placed fifth in the same division, losing the bronze medal match to North Korea's Ri Kyong-ok by an ippon.

At the 2004 Summer Olympics in Athens, Shishkina qualified for the Kazakh squad, as a 35-year-old, in the women's extra-lightweight class (48 kg), by placing third and receiving a berth from the Asian Championships in Almaty. Shishkina opened her match with a more convincing victory over Colombia's Lisseth Orozco by a two-point advantage on koka, before she conceded with a shido penalty and succumbed to an ippon and an uchi mata (inner high throw) assault from Romania's Alina Dumitru. In the repechage, Shishkina offered herself a chance for an Olympic bronze medal, but slipped it away in a defeat to Poland's Anna Żemła-Krajewska by a brilliant ippon three minutes and thirteen seconds into their first playoff of the draft.

References

External links

1969 births
Living people
Sportspeople from Samara, Russia
Russian emigrants to Kazakhstan
Russian female judoka
Kazakhstani female judoka
Olympic judoka of Kazakhstan
Judoka at the 2004 Summer Olympics
Judoka at the 2002 Asian Games
Asian Games competitors for Kazakhstan
Russian sambo practitioners
Kazakhstani sambo practitioners